Jeremy Rall is an American music video director, photographer and independent film director.

Videography

1999

 Heather B. — "Do You"
 Philly's Most Wanted — "Suckas"

2000
 Drama — "Left, Right, Left"
 Drama — "Double Time (Drama's Cadence)"
 Field Mob — "Project Dreams"
 Bad Azz featuring Snoop Dogg and Kokane — "Wrong Idea"
 Sammie featuring Lil' Bow Wow — "Crazy Things I Do" [Remix]
 Ludacris featuring Shawnna — "What's Your Fantasy"
 DJ Clue? featuring Beanie Sigel — "In the Club"

2001

 Ludacris — "Southern Hospitality"
 Tank — "Maybe I Deserve"
 Philly's Most Wanted — "Cross the Border"
 Philly's Most Wanted — "Please Don't Mind"
 Snoop Dogg featuring Soopafly and Butch Cassidy — "Loosen' Control"
 Lil' O featuring Big Hawk — "Back Back"
 Dante Thomas — "Fly"
 Ludacris — "Rollout (My Business)"
 Rell — "If That's My Baby"

2002

 Jim Crow featuring Sean P — "Holla at a Playa"
 Field Mob — "Sick of Being Lonely"
 Talib Kweli featuring Bilal — "Waitin' for the DJ"
 Big Moe — "Purple Stuff"
 Heather B. — "Live MC"
 Beenie Man featuring Sean Paul and Lady Saw — "Bossman"

2003
 Floetry — "Say Yes"
 Chingy featuring Jermaine Dupri and Trina — "Right Thurr" [Remix]
 Chingy featuring Ludacris and Snoop Dogg — "Holidae In"

2004
 Houston featuring Chingy, Nate Dogg and I-20 — "I Like That"
 Chingy — "Balla Baby"

2007
 Kelly Rowland featuring Travis McCoy — "Daylight"

2010
 T-Pain — "Reverse Cowgirl"
 R. Kelly — "When a Woman Loves" (co-director with R. Kelly)

2011
 R. Kelly — "Radio Message"

2012
 Chris Rene — "Young Homie"

2013
 All Time Low — "Backseat Serenade"
 Amplify Dot featuring Busta Rhymes — "I'm Good"

References

External links
 

American music video directors
Film directors from Michigan
Living people
People from Bay City, Michigan
Photographers from Michigan
Year of birth missing (living people)